Secondary antisemitism is a distinct form of antisemitism which is said to have appeared after the end of World War II. Secondary antisemitism is often explained as being caused by the Holocaust, as opposed to existing in spite of it. One frequently quoted formulation of the concept, first published in Henryk M. Broder's 1986 book Der Ewige Antisemit ("The Eternal Antisemite"), stems from the Israeli psychiatrist , who once remarked: "The Germans will never forgive the Jews for Auschwitz."

Adorno, in a 1959 lecture titled "Was bedeutet: Aufarbeitung der Vergangenheit", published in his 1963 book Eingriffe. Neun kritische Modelle, addressed the fallacy of the broad German post-war tendency to associate and simultaneously causally link Jews with the Holocaust. According to Adorno's critique, an opinion had been readily accepted in Germany according to which the Jewish people were culpable in the crimes against them. Jewish guilt was assumed to varying extents, depending on the varying incarnations of that antisemitic notion, one of which is the idea that Jews were (and are) exploiting German guilt over the Holocaust. Adorno further wrote:

Initially, members of the Frankfurt School spoke of "guilt-defensiveness anti-Semitism", an antisemitism motivated by a deflection of guilt. The rehabilitation of many lower and even several higher-ranking Third Reich officials and officers appears to have contributed to the development of secondary antisemitism. These officials were rehabilitated in spite of their considerable individual contributions to Nazi Germany's crimes. Several controversies ensued early in post-World War II Germany, e.g. when Konrad Adenauer appointed Hans Globke as Chief of the Chancellery, although the latter had formulated the emergency legislation that gave Hitler unlimited dictatorial powers and had been one of the leading legal commentators on the Nuremberg race laws of 1935. According to Adorno, parts of the German public never acknowledged these events and instead formed the notion of Jewish guilt in the Holocaust.

An alternative explanation was proposed for the spate of postwar antisemitic violence in Eastern Europe. In 1946, the Slovak writer Karel František Koch argued that the anti-semitic incidents that he witnessed in Bratislava after the war were "not antisemitism, but something far worse—the robber's anxiety that he might have to return Jewish property," a view that has been endorsed by Czech-Slovak scholar . It has been estimated that only 15% of Jewish property was returned after the war, and restitution was "negligible" in Eastern Europe. Property not returned has been valued at over $100 million in 2005 dollars.

See also 

 Anti-Jewish violence in Central and Eastern Europe, 1944–46
 Anti-Jewish violence in Poland, 1944–46
 Kielce pogrom
 Genocide justification
 Daniel Goldhagen
 Holocaust denial
 Criticism of Holocaust denial
 Laws against Holocaust denial
 Amendment to the Act on the Institute of National Remembrance
 Holocaust trivialization
 German collective guilt
 New antisemitism
 Victim blaming
 Victim theory
 The Holocaust Industry
 3D Test of Antisemitism

References

Bibliography

Further reading 
 
 
   from the Organization for Security and Co-operation in Europe Conference on Anti-Semitism and on Other Forms of Intolerance, Cordoba, 8 and 9 June 2005.
 signandsight.com: The anti-Semitism of the 68ers. An interview with Tilman Fichter.

Antisemitism in Germany
Critical theory
Aftermath of the Holocaust
Victimology
Majority–minority relations
Guilt
Defence mechanisms
Holocaust historiography
de:Antisemitismusforschung#Sekundärer Antisemitismus